This list of largest North Carolina higher education institutions by enrollment includes only individual four-year campuses, not four-year universities.  Universities can have multiple campuses with a single administration. Enrollment numbers listed are the sum of undergraduate and graduate students. These numbers should match the enrollment numbers that are reported to the US Department of Education.

Universities
North Carolina